Aalsum may refer to:

 Aalsum, Friesland, a village in the Netherlands
 Aalsum, Groningen, a village in the Netherlands